Sam Shore may refer to:

Sam Shore (tennis), U.S. Pro Tennis Championships draws, 1927–1945
Sammy Shore, founder of The Comedy Store
Sam Shore (screenwriter) on List of Go Girls episodes

See also
Samuel Shore (disambiguation)
Sam Shaw (disambiguation)